Vigilant Applications Ltd is a United Kingdom based software company, which develops and markets the VigilancePro user behaviour monitoring and management product. The company was founded as a result of the collapse and subsequent administration of Overtis Ltd, the previous owners of VigilancePro.

References

External links 
 Official web site of Vigilant Applications Ltd
 Archive of the web site of Overtis Ltd, as held by the Internet Archive Wayback Machine

Computer companies of the United Kingdom